The 1891 United States Senate election in Kansas was held on January 28, 1891, to elect Kansas' Class III senator in its delegation.

Farmers' Alliance/People's nomination

The Farmers' Alliance and People's Party were split into two factions that either supported Peter Percival Elder, who was expected to become the Speaker of the Kansas House of Representatives, or William A. Peffer for the senatorial nomination. It was speculated that Jerry Simpson would be chosen as a compromise candidate between the two factions.

On January 27, 1891, the Farmers' Alliance caucus in the state legislature convened to select the party's nominee for the senate election. The balloting started with seventeen candidates and after seventeen ballots Peffer won, with fifty-six votes, against J. T. Willitts, with thirty-eight votes.

Candidates

William A. Peffer, judge and member of the Kansas Senate
Peter Percival Elder, member of the Kansas House of Representatives
J. T. Willitts

Results

On January 27, 1891, both chambers of the Kansas Legislature informally voted separately on the senatorial candidates. In the House of Representatives, 96 members voted for Peffer, 23 members voted for Ingalls, and 5 members voted for Democratic nominee C. W. Blair. In the Senate, 35 members voted for Ingalls, 1 member voted for Peffer, and 2 voted for other candidates.

On January 28, both chambers of the legislature convened to formally elect the senator. In the join ballot of the House of Representatives and Senate, 101 members voted for Peffer, 58 members voted for Ingalls, 3 members voted for Blair, and 3 members voted for other candidates.

Endorsements

References

1891
Kansas
United States Senate